Jazz Ishmael Butler (born October 3, 1995), professionally known as Lil Tracy, is an American rapper and singer. He was also known under the name Yung Bruh during the beginning of his career. Tracy is best known for his collaborations with the late rapper Lil Peep, specifically "Awful Things" which peaked at 79 on the Billboard Hot 100, and for being a prominent member of the "SoundCloud rap" and underground rap scene.

Early life 
Jazz Butler was born on October 3, 1995, in Teaneck, New Jersey, to Ishmael Butler of Digable Planets and Cheryl Gamble, known professionally as "Coko" from SWV. Talking about growing up in Virginia Beach Butler said "it sucked but I love it." He grew up listening to emo music and Southern hip-hop artists who inspired him to make music. Butler's parents split up when he was young and he would spend time between his mother and father's homes. Butler lived in Seattle, Washington during his adolescent years and attended McClure Middle School and Garfield High School, and chose to be homeless at age 17.

Career

2012–2016: Career beginnings 
Butler started to make music when he was 15 before moving to Los Angeles at 18 (without alerting his parents) to focus more on his music career and due to being homeless. Butler originally started rapping under the name "Yung Bruh", releasing several mixtapes under the Thraxxhouse collective. Some members of Thraxxhouse, including Tracy eventually started their own group, the collective GothBoiClique. Through the group, Butler met New York rapper Lil Peep, the two quickly collaborated on the song "White Tee" from Peep's Crybaby mixtape which gathered attention through the hip-hop underground. He also released a single "Overdose" which escalated his career further.

2017: Tracys Manga, XOXO, and Life of a Popstar 
In mid-2016, Butler changed his stage name from Yung Bruh to Lil Tracy due to discovering that there was already another artist using the "Yung Bruh" moniker. Under his new name he released his long-awaited mixtape Tracy's Manga on February 1, 2017. Butler went on to release XOXO two months later on April 3. Butler featured on the single "Awful Things".  The single peaked at number 79 on the Billboard Hot 100.

Butler released Life of a Popstar on July 31, 2017.

2018–2019: Designer Talk, Sinner, and Anarchy 
In 2018, Lil Tracy released two EPs: Designer Talk on October 5 and long-awaited Sinner on November 2. Lil Tracy released his debut album, Anarchy, on September 20, 2019.

2020–present: Designer Talk 2 and Saturn Child 
On November 13, 2020, Lil Tracy released his second album, Designer Talk 2.

On June 3, 2022, Lil Tracy released his third album, Saturn Child.

Discography

Albums 
Anarchy (2019)
Designer Talk 2 (2020)
Saturn Child (2022)

Mixtapes 
XOXO (2017)
Life of a Popstar (2017)

Extended plays 
Castles (2016)
Castles II (2017)
Fly Away (with Lil Raven) (2017)
Tracy's Manga (2017)
Sinner (2018)
Designer Talk (2018)
Pray (with Drippin So Pretty) (2023)

Compilation albums 
Tracy's World (2018)

References 

Rappers from Virginia
Emo rap musicians
Living people
Garfield High School (Seattle) alumni
African-American male rappers
21st-century American rappers
21st-century American male musicians
1995 births
21st-century African-American musicians